The 2020 IIHF Women's World Championship Division II was scheduled to be two international ice hockey tournaments organised by the International Ice Hockey Federation, but only one tournament was played.

The Division II Group A tournament would have been played in Granada, Spain, from 29 March to 4 April 2020. On 2 March 2020, this tournament was cancelled due to the COVID-19 pandemic. The Division II Group B tournament was played in Akureyri, Iceland, from 23 to 29 February 2020.

Australia won the Division II Group B tournament and were originally promoted, while Ukraine were relegated. However, that promotion was rescinded due to the COVID-19 pandemic.

Division II Group A

Participants

Match officials
Four referees and seven linesmen are selected for the tournament.

Standings

Results
All times are local (UTC+2).

Division II Group B

Participants

Match officials
Four referees and eight linesmen are selected for the tournament.

Final standings

Results
All times are local (UTC±0).

Awards and statistics

Awards

Scoring leaders
List shows the top skaters sorted by points, then goals.

GP = Games played; G = Goals; A = Assists; Pts = Points; +/− = Plus/minus; PIM = Penalties in minutes; POS = Position
Source: IIHF.com

Goaltending leaders
Only the top five goaltenders, based on save percentage, who have played at least 40% of their team's minutes, are included in this list.

TOI = Time on ice (minutes:seconds); SA = Shots against; GA = Goals against; GAA = Goals against average; Sv% = Save percentage; SO = Shutouts
Source: IIHF.com

References

External links
Official website of IIHF

2020
Division II
2020 IIHF Women's World Championship Division II
2020 IIHF Women's World Championship Division II
Sport in Granada
Sport in Akureyri
2020 in Spanish sport
2020 in Icelandic sport
February 2020 sports events in Europe
March 2020 sports events in Europe
April 2020 sports events in Europe
Ice hockey events cancelled due to the COVID-19 pandemic